Franklin A. Welch (born c. 1960) was the ninth Master Chief Petty Officer of the United States Coast Guard.  Welch entered the Coast Guard in 1980 after graduating from Shades Valley High School Class of 1978, in Birmingham, Alabama. A former Master Chief Quartermaster, he served in office from October 10, 2002, to June 14, 2006, and served in the Coast Guard for over 26 years.

Welch, a native of Texas, is married to Mari Lynn Perry of Newport, Rhode Island.  They live in Spotsylvania, VA.

Biography
On October 10, 2002, Welch assumed his duties  as the ninth Master Chief Petty Officer of the Coast Guard. Prior to this assignment, Welch served as Officer-in-Charge, also homeported in Bodega Bay.

Advancing quickly, Welch served in the Coast Guard for 26 years; thirteen of which were as a Master Chief Petty Officer.  He has a diverse background in Coast Guard operations.  He has served aboard  in Cordova, Alaska, where he devoted his off-duty time striking the Quartermaster rating; Aids to Navigation Team Bristol, Rhode Island, as operations and aids to navigation petty officer;  as assistant navigator and deck watch officer;  as assistant navigator and deck watch officer; Fleet Training Unit, U.S. Atlantic Fleet as an underway navigation and visual communications instructor and training liaison officer; and aboard , homeported in Apra Harbor, Guam, as executive petty officer.  Welch also served as "Gold Badge" Command Master Chief for the Ninth Coast Guard District, Cleveland, Ohio, where he represented the enlisted men and women of the "Great Lakes," and as Master Chief of the Coast Guard Chief Petty Officer Academy in Petaluma, California.  Welch was designated as a Master Training Specialist by Commander, Training Command, U.S. Atlantic Fleet where he also received the Coast Guardsman of the Year Award for 1991.  In August 2002, he received the Northern California Senior Enlisted Person of the Year (Operational) award sponsored by the United States Navy League.

Welch attended many specialized training courses during his career, including the Coast Guard Chief Petty Officer Academy, where he was the president of Class XXVI.

Welch has earned the permanent Cutterman Insignia, Coxswain, Command Master Chief, Chief Petty Officer Academy, and Officer in Charge Afloat pins. His military awards include the Coast Guard Distinguished Service Medal, three Meritorious Service Medals, two Coast Guard Commendation Medals with "O" device, the Navy Commendation Medal, the Coast Guard Achievement Medal with "O" device, the Commandant's Letter of Commendation Ribbon with "O" device, two Coast Guard Unit Commendations with "O" device, five Coast Guard Meritorious Unit Commendations with "O" device, four Meritorious Team Commendation ribbons, the Navy Meritorious Unit Commendation, the Coast Guard Bicentennial Unit Commendation ribbon, seven Coast Guard Good Conduct Medals, two National Defense Service Medals, the Global War on Terrorism Service Medal, the Humanitarian Service Medal, three Special Operations Service Ribbons, five Coast Guard Sea Service ribbons, and the Coast Guard Rifle and Pistol Marksmanship ribbons.

Awards and decorations
 Cutterman Insignia
 Coxswain Insignia
 Officer-in-Charge Afloat Pin
 Commandant Staff Badge
 Master Chief Petty Officer of the Coast Guard
 Coast Guard Distinguished Service Medal
 Meritorious Service Medal with one gold award star
 Coast Guard Commendation Medal with "O" device and award star
6 gold Service stripes.

Retirement
Master Chief Charles (Skip) W. Bowen assumed the duties as the tenth Master Chief Petty Officer of the Coast Guard on June 14, 2006, in a ceremony held at the USCG Telecommunications and Information Systems Command (TISCOM).

References

External links
 Coast Guard biography

Living people
People from Texas
People from Arlington County, Virginia
Master Chief Petty Officers of the Coast Guard
1959 births
Military personnel from Texas